Nancy Hanks (1886 – August 16, 1915) was an undefeated Standardbred trotting mare named for Abraham Lincolns mother. She was the first 2:05 trotter in harness-racing history.

She was foaled in 1886 on what is now known as Poplar Hill Farm, near Lexington, Kentucky.  Bred by Hart Boswell, she was sired by Happy Medium; her dam, Nancy Lee, was by Dictator.

While owned by John Malcolm Forbes, on September 28, 1892 the brown mare trotted a mile in 2 minutes and 4 seconds at Terre Haute's Four Cornered Track with a bicycle sulky, breaking all Sunol's mark of 2 minutes 8.25 seconds set in 1891. Nancy Hanks lost one race heat (in her first start), but was undefeated in her races. She was inducted into the Harness Racing Museum & Hall of Fame in 1955.

Nancy Hanks died on August 16, 1915 at age 29, and is buried in the Hamburg Place equine cemetery. A statue of her was created by sculptor Charles Cary Rumsey.

A passenger train from Atlanta to Savannah from 1947 to 1971 was named in her honor.

References

American Standardbred racehorses
United States Harness Racing Hall of Fame inductees
1886 racehorse births
1915 racehorse deaths
Individual mares
Undefeated racehorses